Ardonea is a genus of moths in the subfamily Arctiinae.

Species
 Ardonea judaphila Schaus, 1905
 Ardonea metallica Schaus, 1892
 Ardonea morio Walker, 1854
 Ardonea nigella Dognin, 1905
 Ardonea rosada Dognin, 1894
 Ardonea tenebrosa Walker, 1864

References

Natural History Museum Lepidoptera generic names catalog

Lithosiini
Moth genera